"Secrets" is a song recorded by American singer Pink from her seventh studio album Beautiful Trauma. Pink co-wrote the song with its producers, Max Martin, Shellback, and Oscar Holter. The song was released to hot adult contemporary radio on August 2, 2018, as the sixth and final single from the album.

Music video
The official music video for the song was released on July 24, 2018. It features P!nk and the backup dancers from the Beautiful Trauma World Tour going out at night. It was filmed after one of P!nk's shows in Perth, Australia.

Critical reception
Andrew Unterberger of Billboard stated that “Secrets even has a touch of deep house to it. But it is unmistakably heavy”

Track listing
Remixes EP
 "Secrets" (Syn Cole Remix) – 3:10
 "Secrets" (Until Dawn Remix) – 3:33
 "Secrets" (Rescue Rangerz Remix) – 3:26
 "Secrets" (DJ Suri and Chris Daniel Remix) – 3:46

Charts

Year-end charts

References

2017 songs
Pink (singer) songs
Songs written by Oscar Holter
Songs written by Pink (singer)
Songs written by Max Martin
Songs written by Shellback (record producer)

fr:Secrets (chanson de Pink)